Henry Gibbs (1630/1–1713) was an English oil painter.

Gibbs worked in Canterbury, Kent. He painted "Aeneas and his Family Fleeing Burning Troy" in 1654, acquired by the Tate Britain gallery, London, in 1994. There are also works by Gibbs in the Beaney House of Art and Knowledge and the Canterbury Heritage Museum. His paintings have been sold through Christie's auction house.

References

1631 births
1713 deaths
People from Canterbury
17th-century English painters
English male painters
English portrait painters